Israel "Izzy" Adewale Abanikanda (born October 5, 2002) is an American football running back for the Pittsburgh Panthers. Abanikanda set the Pitt single game rushing record of 320 yards in a game against Virginia Tech in Week 6 of 2022, breaking the record of 303 yards set by Tony Dorsett in 1975. In the same game, he tied a school, and ACC conference record of 6 rushing touchdowns in a game.

High school career
Abanikanda attended Abraham Lincoln High School in Brooklyn, New York. As a senior, he was the Gatorade Football Player of the Year for New York after rushing for 1,350 yards with 20 touchdowns. As he entered his senior season of high school, Abanikanda was ranked a three star recruit and received scholarship offers from seventeen schools. On June 24, 2019, Abanikanda committed to the University of Pittsburgh to play college football.

College career
As a true freshman at Pittsburgh in 2020, Abanikanda played in seven games, rushing 28 times for 95 yards and one touchdown. As a sophomore in 2021, he played in all 13 games with six starts and rushed for 651 yards on 123 carries with seven touchdowns. Abanikanda also returned seven kicks for 206 yards, averaging 29.4 yards per attempt.

In July 2022, Abanikanda was named to the Paul Hornung Award Preseason Watchlist. Abanikanda returned to Pittsburgh as a starter in 2022. In Week 1 of the 2022 season, at the first Backyard Brawl between Pitt and West Virginia since 2011, Abanikanda rushed only sixteen yards on eight carries. Following Rodney Hammond's injury at the game, Abanikanda stepped into a larger role. On September 10, 2022, against Tennessee, Abanikanda rushed a 76-yard touchdown, Pitt's longest rushing touchdown since 2018. Abanikanda finished the game with a total of 154 rushing yards despite Pitt losing in overtime, 34-27. Abanikanda was named ACC Running Back of the Week for his performance in the game. Against Western Michigan, Abanikanda gained 133 yards on 31 carries and was named to the Paul Hornung Award Honor Roll.

On September 24, 2022, Abanikanda rushed nineteen times for a total of 177 yards against the Rhode Island Rams. Following the game, Abanikanda had earned a total of 479 rushing yards and six touchdowns on 83 carries for the season and was ranked second in the nation for all-purpose yards with an average of 180.24 yards. At the end of Week 4, Abanikanda also led the ACC in both rushing yards and all-purpose yards. For his performance against Rhode Island, he was named ACC Running Back of the Week for the second time of the 2022 season.

On October 1, 2022, Abanikanda suffered a shoulder injury in the second quarter and had to watch the remainder of the game from the sideline with his shoulder in a sling. Abanikanda recovered in time for the next game, and at Pitt's homecoming game on October 8, 2022, Pitt beat Virginia Tech with a score of 45-29. During the game, Abanikanda rushed for 320 yards, breaking the school record of 303 yards set by Tony Dorsett in 1975. In the same game, Abanikanda garnered six rushing touchdowns, tying the ACC conference single-game record set in 1981 and the Pitt single-game record set in 1910. Abanikanda received five honors for his performance in the game, including Doak Walker Running Back of the Week, Walter Camp National Offensive Player of the Week, Pro Football Focus National Offensive Player of the Week, ESPN College Football Final "Helmet Sticker", and his third ACC Running Back of the Week in the 2022 season.

Abanikanda finished the 2022 season with 1,431 yards and 20 touchdowns. He received the second most votes for ACC Player of the Year.

In January 2023, Abanikanda was invited to the NFL Scouting Combine.

Statistics

References

External links
Pittsburgh Panthers bio

2002 births
Living people
Players of American football from New York (state)
American football running backs
Pittsburgh Panthers football players